Vase Rock is a rock just off Liuqiu Island of Pingtung County, Taiwan.

Geology
The rock was formed by the rising of the coastal coral reef. Its lower part has been eroded by the sea thus forming a vase-shaped structure.

Legacy
The Liuqiu township's tourism department ascribes the island's former name "Golden Lion Island" to Vase Rock's supposed resemblance to a lion's head, although the name actually honors the slaughtered crew of the Dutch ship , the punitive reprisals for whichparticularly the Liuqiu Island Massacredepopulated the island in the 1630s and 1640s.

See also
 Geology of Taiwan

References

Landforms of Pingtung County
Rock formations of Taiwan